Zheng Yecheng (born 26 August 1993) is a Chinese actor. He graduated from the National Academy of Chinese Theatre Arts, majoring in Chinese opera.

Biography
Zheng made his acting debut in 2012, co-starring in the film The Cosplayers. He was then cast in his first television series, A Legend of Chinese Immortal.

Zheng first attracted attention with his role as Wang Cai in the popular xianxia television series  Swords of Legends. The same year he starred in the family drama He and His Sons, winning acclaim for his role as a rebellious teenager.

Zheng gained further recognition with his role as Nan Xianyue in the hit xianxia romance drama The Journey of Flower. The same year, he starred in the historical drama The Legend of Mi Yue, playing Song Yu.

Zheng's breakout role was in the romantic comedy series Love O2O, where he became known by his character "Senior Beauty". The same year, he starred in his first lead role in Huajianghu, a live-action web series based on the anime of the same name.

Zheng then reunited with The Journey of Flower co-star An Yuexi in the fantasy comedy web series Let's Shake It. The low budget series unexpectedly become popular and gained positive reviews. He subsequently reprised his role in the second season of the series.

In 2018, Zheng starred alongside Janice Wu in the fantasy action drama An Oriental Odyssey. In 2019, Zheng co-starred in the historical political drama Royal Nirvana.

In 2019, Zheng played the male lead in xianxia romance drama Love of Thousand Years, and historical romance drama The Sleepless Princess.

Filmography

Film

Television series

Discography

Accolades

References

Living people
1993 births
21st-century Chinese male actors
Chinese male television actors
Chinese male film actors
Male actors from Jilin
People from Jilin City
National Academy of Chinese Theatre Arts alumni
Affiliated Chinese Opera School of Shanghai Theatre Academy alumni